Cancer susceptibility 21 is a protein that in humans is encoded by the CASC21 gene.

References

Further reading